Miss Universe Malaysia 2022 was the 55th edition of the Miss Universe Malaysia pageant which was held on 7 October 2022 at M Resort and Hotel, Damansara, Kuala Lumpur. Miss Universe Malaysia 2020, Francisca Luhong James crowned Cheam Wei Yeng at the end of the event. She represented Malaysia in Miss Universe 2022.

Background

Location and date 
Beauty camp of Miss Universe Malaysia 2022 was held from June until October.

On 8 September 2022, it was confirmed via Miss Universe Malaysia Instagram that the finale will take place at a new 5-star well-connected luxurious escape M Resort and Hotel conveniently nestled in the green belt of Damansara in Kuala Lumpur on 7 October 2022.

The Next Miss Universe Malaysia Reality Show 
Sixth-webisodes of reality show entitled "The Next Miss Universe Malaysia 2022" was released via YouTube on Miss Universe Malaysia Channel.

Pageant

Gala Night 
On 8 September 2022, the organization announced that the gala night will be held at M Resort and Hotel in Kuala Lumpur. Due to organisers not getting approval from the Kuala Lumpur City Hall, the swimsuit competition for this edition has been cancelled.

Selection committee 

 Kenny Yee – Founder of Make Up Miracle & Beauty Workshop
 Datin Selwinder Kaur – Chief Executive Officer of Glojas Aesthetic Clinic
 Rizman Ruzaini – Malaysian fashion designer 
 Don Teo – Director of Operations, M Resort and Hotel 
 Andrea Wong – Creative director and fashion stylist
 Dr. Karen Po – Medical Director of La Jung
 Shweta Sekhon – Miss Universe Malaysia 2019

Placements 
Color keys

Awards

Contestants 
15 contestants competed for the title. Seven from Selangor, two from Melaka, and one each from Kuala Lumpur, Sabah, Penang, Sarawak, Perak and Pahang.

Notes

References

External links 
 
 
 

2022 in Malaysia
2022 beauty pageants
2022
Miss Universe